Mark Woodforde defeated Wally Masur 6–2, 6–4 to secure the title.

Seeds

  Wally Masur (final)
  Michiel Schapers (first round)
  Mark Woodforde (champion)
  Peter Doohan (first round)
  John Fitzgerald (semifinals)
  Darren Cahill (first round)
  Christian Saceanu (first round)
  Matt Anger (first round)

Draw

Finals

Top half

Bottom half

External links
1988 South Australian Open Draw

Singles